Cimolodontidae is a family of fossil mammals within the extinct order Multituberculata.  Representatives are known from the Upper Cretaceous and Paleocene of North America. The family Cimolodontidae was named by Othniel Charles Marsh in 1889 and is part of the suborder Cimolodonta within the superfamily Ptilodontoidea.

References 
 Marsh (1889), "Discovery of Cretaceous Mammalia. Part II." Am. J. Sci., 3, 38, p. 81-92.
 Kielan-Jaworowska Z & Hurum JH (2001), "Phylogeny and Systematics of multituberculate mammals." Paleontology 44, p. 389-429.

Ptilodontoids
Cretaceous mammals of North America
Paleocene mammals
Paleocene extinctions
Late Cretaceous first appearances
Prehistoric mammal families